Escort is a 1942 play by the British writer Patrick Hastings. It is a wartime spy thriller about sabotage on a Royal Navy ship.

It ran for 24 performances at the West End Lyric Theatre between 18 August and 5 September 1942. The cast included Thorley Walters, Michael Shepley, John Stuart and Barry Morse. It was produced by Basil Dean.

It was praised by The Spectator, which had recently panned Terrence Rattigan's much more successful Flare Path, as "the best and most convincing spy play" to date.

References

Bibliography

 Wearing, J.P. The London Stage 1940-1949: A Calendar of Productions, Performers, and Personnel.  Rowman & Littlefield, 2014.

1942 plays
Plays by Patrick Hastings
Plays about World War II
West End plays